Samba Dashami is a festival unique to the state of Odisha, India. It is celebrated on the 10th day of the Shukla Paksha of Pausha Māsa or waxing phase of moon in the month of Pausha (December – January) as per traditional Odia calendar. This festival is especially celebrated in the eastern part of Odisha.

Tradition 
According to legend, Samba, son of Lord  Krishna, was afflicted by leprosy and was cured by the Sun God Surya after 12 years of penance near Konark. On this day, mothers pray to Surya for the health of their children.

Rituals 
On the day of Samba Dashami, the women in the family wake before sunrise. After bathing they prepare dishes such as khichdi, Odia puri, and ghadghadia tarkari (a curry), and offer them to Surya at sunrise. One of the specific characters of this ritual is variety of individual food item is offered to Sun God in the name of each member of the family, especially children. Once the food items have been offered to the Surya, the women prepare a set of cake-like dishes called pitha (cake), which includes manda pitha, kakara pitha, poda pitha, arisha pitha, biri laddoo, makar chaula, chhenaguda, dhanu muaan, khiri, rasagulla, jhilli, chhenagaja, and sweet curd.

At noon, a bowl of turmeric water with betel in it is taken to chaunra mula (a small temple-like structure with a tulsi plant overhead). All the cooked food is served on plates. The women in the family view Surya through the bowl of turmeric water and offer all the dishes to Surya. They read the legend of Samba Dasami Brata Katha and pray for the well-being of all family members.

In the evening, another puja is observed as a part of the Samba Dashami ritual. This is the Mahakala puja, in which special budha chakuli is offered to Yama.

See also 
 Biranchi Narayan Sun Temple
 Konark

References

External links 
 Samba Dashami 2022 date in Odisha – Puja Dedicated to Surya at Hindu Blog
 Rituals of Samba Dashami and Foods – Samba Dashami

Festivals in Odisha
Surya
Krishna